The 1996 United States Senate election in Alaska was held on November 5, 1996. Incumbent Republican United States Senator Ted Stevens ran for re-election to a sixth term in the United States Senate. Stevens faced off against Democratic nominee Theresa Obermeyer, a former member of the Anchorage School Board, and Green Party nominee Jed Whittaker, a commercial fisherman. Stevens won in a landslide.

Open primary

Candidates

Democratic
 Michael Beasley, perennial candidate
 Henry J. Blake Jr.
 Lawrence Freiberger, former congressional candidate
 Robert Alan Gigler
 Theresa Obermeyer, former Anchorage School Board member
 Joseph A. Sonneman, perennial candidate
 Frank Vondersaar, perennial candidate

Republican
 Ted Stevens, incumbent United States Senator since 1968
 David Cuddy, former Alaska State Representative
 Charles E. McKee

Green
 Jed Whittaker, commercial fisherman

Results

General election

Campaign
The race drew national attention for Obermeyer's erratic behavior: she blamed Stevens for her husband's failure to pass the bar exam twenty-one times, and contended that Stevens had passed the bar by fraud. She "trailed" him to campaign events, frequently wearing a prisoner's outfit and once dragging a ball and chain behind her. In June and July 1996, she served a sentence of 30 days in prison for disorderly conduct because of her role in a disturbance at a federal courthouse, while on probation for a 1994 conviction of disorderly conduct for instigating another disturbance at the same courthouse.  Obermeyer attracted public attention, and possibly sympathy, during the campaign when, after serving seven days of her sentence in Alaska state prison, she was moved in the middle of the night to a Portland, Oregon county jail, and after a week there, she was moved to a federal prison in Dublin, California; her husband and attorney each complained about the moves, and a Federal prison official acknowledged that they were unusual.  During the televised debate before the general election, after discussing diseases of the brain, Stevens earnestly said to his opponent, "I think you need help, Mrs. Obermeyer," a response described fourteen years later in The Anchorage Daily News as one that "has become, it is safe to say, legendary."

The televised primary election debates on August 21, 1996, also drew national attention for the unusual cast of characters seeking to oppose Stevens, particularly the seven candidates on the Democratic side.  A column on the national PoliticsNow website, headlined "Alaska Displays the Scary Side of Democracy," described the debate as "what would happen if the Addams Family appeared on Meet the Press," leading to nationwide sales by public TV station KAKM of a record number of copies of the debate video.  Anchorage Daily News columnist Mike Doogan described the debate as "what would happen if the folks from Jabba the Hutt's headquarters dropped by the Mad Hatter's tea party."

Results
In the general election, Stevens was re-elected in an overwhelming landslide, and Whittaker finished ahead of Obermeyer.

See also 
 1996 United States Senate elections

References 

1996 Alaska elections
Alaska
1996